Wieselburg (Central Bavarian: Wieslbuag) is a town in Lower Austria, Austria, located near the River Erlauf. Its name roughly translates to castle where two rivers meet, as there are two rivers that run together to create the Erlauf. Its population is approximately 4,200 (including surrounding villages).

A brewery, an agricultural college and research institute (HBLFA Francisco Josephinum), a college of higher education (Fachhochschule), and one of the oldest churches north of the Alps dating from AD 976 are located in the town. Wieselburg was made a town 1000 years later, in 1976.
Annually in the ending of June beginning of July an agricultural fair, Wieselburger Messe, takes place.

Population

People 
 Karl Bienenstein (de)
 Alfred Gusenbauer, educated here
 Paul Hörbiger (de)
 Eugen Wüster (de)

References

External links 
  Municipal website
  HBLFA website
  More information

Cities and towns in Scheibbs District